Keith Amemiya (born September 1, 1965) is an American business executive and politician who ran in the 2020 Honolulu mayoral election, and in 2022 for lieutenant governor of Hawaii.

Background
Amemiya is the son of former Hawaii Attorney General Ronald Amemiya. His mother suffered from mental illness and Keith was brought up by various relatives until he moved in with a friend whose father, Bert T. Kobayashi Jr., became Keith's hānai father. After graduating from Punahou in 1983, Amemiya studied finance and law at the University of Hawaiʻi at Mānoa, where he earned his degrees.

Since January 2021, Amemiya has served as executive director of the Central Pacific Bank Foundation. Before running for elected office, he was the senior vice president of Island Holdings, Inc., starting in 2012, and executive director of the Hawaii High School Athletic Association from 1998 to 2010. Until 2019 he was the campaign treasurer for U.S. Senator Brian Schatz, and was appointed by several state leaders to serve on citizen boards, including the Honolulu Police Commission, Hawaii Board of Education, and Aloha Stadium Authority board.

2020 Honolulu mayoral election

With no candidate receiving an outright majority of the vote in the August 8 nonpartisan blanket primary, the top two finishers, Amemiya and Rick Blangiardi, advanced to a runoff on November 3. In the primary, former U.S. representative for Hawaii's 1st congressional district Colleen Hanabusa, former state senator John Carroll, and former mayor of Honolulu Mufi Hannemann were eliminated along with many other candidates. Blangiardi won the runoff with 58.2% of the vote. Japanese in Hawaii are the state's second-largest ethnic group, and Amemiya would have been the first mayor of Honolulu of Japanese ancestry.

Endorsements
 U.S. Senator Brian Schatz
 AFL–CIO
 Honolulu City Council members Anderson, Elefante, Manahan, Pine, and Waters
 Hawaii Government Employees Association

2022 Hawaii lieutenant gubernatorial election

With 23.2% of the vote, Amemiya placed third in the 2022 Democratic primary election for Hawaii lieutenant governor and was thus eliminated.

Personal life
Amemiya's biological parents divorced when he was 10 years old, and he was raised afterward by a friend's family.

Amemiya met his wife, Bonny (née Suzui), in 1995 when she was the CFO of a local fast food chain. They married in 1996 and have a son.

In February 2021, Amemiya was appointed as executive director of Central Pacific Bank Foundation.

References

1965 births
Living people
American business executives
Hawaii politicians of Japanese descent
Hawaii Democrats
University of Hawaiʻi at Mānoa alumni
Candidates in the 2020 United States elections
Candidates in the 2022 United States elections